The R693 road is a regional road in Ireland linking Urlingford to Kilkenny City, all in County Kilkenny. It passes through the small town of Freshford en route.

See also
Roads in Ireland
National primary road
National secondary road

References
Roads Act 1993 (Classification of Regional Roads) Order 2006 – Department of Transport

Regional roads in the Republic of Ireland
Roads in County Kilkenny